The Madra were an ancient people who lived in northwest Panjab in ancient India.

Madra may also refer to:
 Madra Kingdom, as described in the text of the Mahabharata
 Uttaramadra,  a northern branch of the Madra Kingdom
 Madri, a princess of the Madra Kingdom, who was to become a wife of King Pandu
 Madra Mountains, a mountain range in the Aegean range of Turkey
 Madra (album), the debut album of the band Miranda Sex Garden
 Mądra, a Polish feminine surname

See also
Madras (disambiguation)